Nebria tatrica dumbirensis is a subspecies of ground beetle in the Nebriinae subfamily that is endemic to the mountain range of Nízké Tatry in Slovakia, and Czech Republic.

References

tatrica dumbirensis
Beetles described in 1957
Beetles of Europe
Endemic fauna of Slovakia